Vid Kidz was a video game developer formed in 1981 by Defender programmers Eugene Jarvis and Larry DeMar, following their departure from Williams Electronics. Williams contracted with Vid Kidz to design games for them. Vid Kidz was disbanded in 1984.

Games developed by Vid Kidz
Defender (1981)
Stargate (1981, AKA Defender II)
Robotron: 2084 (1982)
Blaster (1983)

References

Video game development companies
Video game companies of the United States
WMS Industries